This article lists the records of the Southern Kings. The team participated in Super Rugby in 2013, 2016 and 2017 and in the Pro14 since the 2017–18 season. In addition to those two competitions, they also played first class matches against the British & Irish Lions in 2009, played in the IRB Nations Cup in 2011 and played in two promotion/relegation matches after the 2013 Super Rugby season.

Team match records

The Southern Kings' team match records are:

Player match records

The Southern Kings' player match records are:

Team season records

The Southern Kings' team season records are:

Player season records

The Southern Kings' player season records are:

Player career records

The Southern Kings' player career records are:

Results per opposition

The Southern Kings full playing record against other teams is:

See also

 Southern Kings
 Super Rugby
 Pro14

Notes

References

External links
 Official website

Southern Kings
Southern Kings records